Dezg-e Bala (also Romanized as Dezg-e Bālā; also known as Dezg, Desok, Dezak, Dezq, Dozq, and Qal‘eh Dijag) is a village in Zirkuh Rural District, Central District, Zirkuh County, South Khorasan Province, Iran. At the 2006 census, its population was 104, in 34 families.

References 

Populated places in Zirkuh County